Las Américas International Airport (or AILA)  is an international airport located in Punta Caucedo, near Santo Domingo and Boca Chica in the Dominican Republic. The airport is run by Aeropuertos Dominicanos Siglo XXI (AERODOM), a private corporation based in the Dominican Republic, under a 25-year concession to build, operate, and transfer (BOT) six of the country's airports. Las Américas usually receives a wide variety of long-, mid-, and short-haul aircraft. Santo Domingo's other airport, La Isabela, is much smaller and used by light aircraft only.

The airport is the second-busiest in the country, after Punta Cana International Airport, and one of the largest in the Caribbean, handling 3.5 million passengers in 2015. It is also the busiest cargo hub in the Caribbean and Central America, with 355,000,000 lbs of cargo transported in 2019.

History 
Las Américas Airport opened in 1959 as the official airport of Ciudad Trujillo, the capital of the Dominican Republic with the city subsequently changing its name to Santo Domingo. The official name of the airport was changed in 2002 to "Aeropuerto Internacional Las Américas- José Francisco Peña Gómez (AIJFPG)" but is known as "Las Américas International Airport", or locally, "Las Américas Airport, AILA or "El Aeropuerto".

In 1954, U.S. based Delta Air Lines (which was known as "Delta C&S" at the time following its acquisition and merger with Chicago and Southern Air Lines) was serving the Dominican Republic on a daily basis via the then-named General Andrews Airport in Ciudad Trujillo with nonstop flights to San Juan, Puerto Rico and Port au Prince, Haiti operated with Convair 340 twin prop aircraft. The eastbound Delta flights operated a daily routing of Houston - New Orleans - Havana, Cuba - Port au Prince - Ciudad Trujillo - San Juan and the westbound Delta flights operated a daily routing of San Juan - Ciudad Trujillo - Port au Prince - Havana - New Orleans.  Also during the mid 1950s, U.S. based Pan American World Airways (Pan Am) was serving Ciudad Trujillo with nonstop flights to New York City, Miami and Port au Prince operated with Douglas DC-6 four engine propliners (which the airline called the "Super-6 Clipper"). In 1960, locally-based Dominicana de Aviacion, the former flag carrier of the Dominican Republic, was operating scheduled international passenger service nonstop between the airport and Miami with Douglas DC-4 four engine propliners and also nonstop between the airport and San Juan, Puerto Rico with Douglas DC-3 and Curtiss C-46 twin prop aircraft.  

By the early and mid 1960s, several airlines were operating international jet service from the airport including Pan Am with Boeing 707 service nonstop to New York City, Miami, San Juan, Puerto Rico, Kingston, Jamaica and Curacao as well as direct, no change of plane 707 service to Montego Bay, Caracas, Port of Spain, Georgetown, Guyana and Paramaribo while Brazil-based VARIG was operating Sud Aviation Caravelle and Convair 990 jetliner flights nonstop to New York City and Miami as well as direct, no change of plane jet service to Port of Spain, Belem, Fortaleza, Recife, Rio de Janeiro, Sao Paulo and Porto Alegre.

By 1976, the airport was being served by American Airlines with nonstop Boeing 707 and Boeing 747 flights from New York City, Dominicana de Aviacion with nonstop Boeing 727-100, Boeing 727-200, Boeing 707-399C, Boeing 747 and McDonnell Douglas DC-10 (leased aircraft) service from New York City, Miami and San Juan, Puerto Rico, Eastern Airlines with nonstop Boeing 727-100 service from San Juan, Puerto Rico as well as direct, no change of plane 727 flights from Cleveland and Miami, Pan Am with nonstop Boeing 707 service from Port au Prince as well as direct, one stop 707 service from Miami, ALM Antillean Airlines with nonstop and direct one stop McDonnell Douglas DC-9-30 service from Curacao, Viasa with nonstop Douglas DC-8 service from Curacao and direct one stop DC-8 flights from Caracas, and locally-based Aerovias Quisqueyana with nonstop Boeing 707 and Douglas DC-8 service from Miami and San Juan, Puerto Rico.  Also in 1976, Aerovias Quisqueyana was operating nonstop Boeing 707 transatlantic service from the airport to Madrid with this flight also providing direct one stop service to Rome.

According to the Official Airline Guide (OAG), in 1996 a number of European based airlines were operating transatlantic flights from the airport including Air France with nonstop Boeing 747 service to Paris, Alitalia with nonstop Boeing 767-300 service to Rome, Condor Airlines with nonstop Boeing 767-300 service to both Cologne/Bonn and Frankfurt, Iberia Airlines with nonstop McDonnell Douglas DC-10 service to Madrid, LTU International Airways with nonstop McDonnell Douglas MD-11 service to Dusseldorf, Martinair with nonstop Boeing 767-300 service to Amsterdam, and TAP Air Portugal with direct one stop Airbus A310 service to Lisbon.  Airline service from the airport to South America in 1996 included nonstop Boeing 727-200 flights to Bogota operated by ACES Colombia as well as nonstop McDonnell Douglas DC-10 flights to Lima operated by Iberia Airlines in addition to direct, no change of plane Boeing 737-200 flights also to Lima operated by Copa Airlines via a stop at this air carrier's hub in Panama City, Panama.
Also according to the OAG, other airlines operating flights into the airport in 1996 included American Airlines with nonstop Airbus A300-600R, McDonnell Douglas DC-10 and McDonnell Douglas MD-11 service from New York City as well as nonstop Airbus A300-600R and Boeing 727-200 service from Miami in addition to direct one stop Airbus A300-600R service from both Boston and Orlando, Continental Airlines with nonstop Boeing 727-200 service from Newark, Trans World Airlines (TWA) with nonstop Boeing 767-200 and Lockheed L-1011 service from New York City, and locally-based APA International Air with nonstop Airbus A300 service from both New York City and Miami.

Las Américas was the hub for Dominicana de Aviación, APA International Air, PAWA Dominicana, and a number of other, smaller airlines. Currently SAP Air is based there.

Las Américas also has served as a hub for airlines such as Aeromar Líneas Aéreas Dominicanas, Aero Continente Dominicana and Queen Air.

Recently, the expressway leading from Santo Domingo to the airport (roughly 20 km east of the city center) was expanded and modernised. The airport was also modernised, and two more terminals were added, including 20 more gates. The new expressway crosses a new suspension bridge which spans the Ozama River, connecting traffic into the city's Elevated Freeway and Tunnel system onto the city's main street, Av. 27 de Febrero. A more scenic route following the coastal shore provides beautiful views of the Caribbean Sea and of the city. This secondary road crosses the Ozama River by means of a floating bridge, connecting traffic onto the Av. George Washington (el Malecón) which leads into the heart of the colonial city.

Addition of northern terminal 
On 18 April 2007, a new terminal was completed and opened for operations. It can accommodate four Boeing 747s simultaneously. This new terminal has four gates with boarding bridges, an air-conditioning system, and maintenance facilities for aircraft.

Runway 
Las Américas Airport's runway direction is north–south (designated 17–35). This runway is the largest in the country, and one of the largest in the Caribbean. With a length of 3,355 m, it is able to support a Boeing 747. The runway of SDQ was last renovated in June 2008. The old taxi-way was also renovated and converted into a full runway while the old runway was being renovated, then it was converted back into a taxiway after the normal runway was finished. The runway accommodated the Antonov An-225 to supply goods after the 2010 Haiti earthquake.

Concourses 
Las Américas has five gates on the main satellite concourse (A), A2 through A6. Other gate facilities are for the flights departing from a parking in the taxiway. back in the 1960s and 70s the airport used to be much smaller, The original building was half the size of today's newest structure but with a still modern look.

Concourse B has four gates (B1 through B4) and remote stand (P8). Terminal B now features a co-branded Copa Club operated jointly by United Airlines and Copa Airlines, and a Private Lounge exclusive to members and business people.

The average number of daily flights in and out of Las Américas ranges between 68 and 84 flights. JetBlue is the largest airline operating at Las Américas.

Airlines and destinations

Passenger

Cargo

Statistics

Accidents and incidents
 On February 15, 1970, a Dominicana de Aviación DC-9 flying to Luis Muñoz Marín International Airport in San Juan, Puerto Rico, crashed, killing all 102 people on board. See the Dominicana DC-9 air disaster. 
 On 30 January 1975, Douglas DC-3 HI-222 of LANSA crashed on take-off, killing one of the 30 people on board. The aircraft was on an international scheduled passenger flight to Mais Gate Airport, Port-au-Prince, Haiti.
 On December 15, 2021 a Gulfstream IV business jet, registered as HI1050, departed Santo Domingo’s La Isabella International Airport, en route to Orlando, Florida, before diverting to Las Americas International airport where the aircraft crashed during an attempted landing. Nine casualties were reported with no survivors. The incident is pending investigation.

See also 
 List of the busiest airports in Dominican Republic
 List of the busiest airports in the Caribbean

References

External links 

 Aeropuerto Internacional Las Américas-JFPG

Airports in the Dominican Republic
Buildings and structures in Santo Domingo Province
Airports established in 1959
1959 establishments in North America